Aisleyne Horgan-Wallace (};  born 28 December 1978) is an English television personality, model, actress and columnist who emerged into the public eye in 2006 when she appeared as a contestant in the seventh series of reality television show Big Brother.

Career
Horgan-Wallace began her career as an actress. In 2006, she had a small non-speaking part in the film Rollin' with the Nines.

2006: Big Brother
Horgan-Wallace became a tabloid celebrity in the United Kingdom after being selected as a contestant in Big Brother 2006, the seventh series of the Channel 4 reality television show 'Big Brother. She entered the Big Brother House on Day 12 of the show and became known for her personality clashes with fellow contestants Nikki Grahame and Grace Adams-Short (although she later became good friends with the former until Grahame's death in April 2021); she was voted into the "House Next Door" by the public——a secret room, unknown to the other contestants, where she was forced to choose whom of five new contestants would become new housemates. She was filmed masturbating on the lavatory, although this footage was not broadcast at the time. Horgan-Wallace reached the final day of the show, where she eventually finished third with 22% of the public vote.

2007–present: Transitions into television work 

Since 2007, Horgan-Wallace has been a frequent guest on the Big Brother spin-off shows Big Brother's Big Mouth, Big Brother's Little Brother and, since the show's move to Channel 5 in 2011, Big Brother's Bit on the Side. She also put her name to Big Brother columns for The Sun Online.

Horgan-Wallace has appeared in a number of episodes of Charlie Brooker's Screenwipe. She has also presented for shows such as T4. She appeared in BBC One's Test The Nation, on a team with several other Big Brother contestants. She also made a small appearance on The Charlotte Church Show.
She appeared in several episodes of the Red TV series Celebrity: Stars at Work, which aired in December 2007 and January 2008. Following on from this, Horgan-Wallace signed a  contract with Red TV to film a self-titled, fly-on-the-wall documentary. Four episodes of the resulting programme, named eponymously Aisleyne, were broadcast, the first being aired on 5 March 2008.

In June 2008, Horgan-Wallace made a guest appearance on a special edition of The Friday Night Project, which aired after the launch of Big Brother 2008, the ninth series of Big Brother. Her contributions to the show included a sketch that mocked her rivalry with former housemate Nikki Grahame. In August 2008, she made a brief cameo appearance in The Kevin Bishop Show. Two months later she cameoed in Channel 4 and E4's horror series Dead Set, playing herself. She featured in the first and the fifth episodes In the first episode, she played a zombie version of herself.

On 2 March 2009, Horgan-Wallace underwent a 'make-under' for the BBC Three programme Snog Marry Avoid?, presented by Jenny Frost. She was persuaded that a more natural look with less heavy make-up suited her. In May 2009, she was interviewed for the E4/Channel 4 programme Big Brother: A Decade in the Headlines, written and presented by Grace Dent.

In March 2010, Horgan-Wallace appeared as a guest diner on the Living TV programme, Celebrity Restaurant in Our Living Room. In August 2010, she turned down an offer to appear in Ultimate Big Brother in order to shoot her scenes for a minor role in the British comedy film Anuvahood instead. She played the role of Maria in the film. Anuvahood was released in the UK on 18 March 2011 but was not a success. On 5 May 2011 she starred in an episode of Celebrity Hens and Stags for Wedding TV. She helped organise a stag night in Edinburgh, including racing in an off-road buggy, which later was involved in a hit and run incident in Leith. In June 2011, she appeared as a contestant in the TV3 (Ireland) series Celebrity Salon. She finished runner-up behind a TV presenter called Alan Hughes.

In January 2012, Horgan-Wallace appeared in the third series of the Channel 4 show Celebrity Coach Trip, alongside fellow Big Brother contestant Nikki Grahame. The pair were given a 'red card' and dismissed from the show on Day 3 of the series after falling out with other celebrities, including Edwina Currie and Jean Broke-Smith. From December 2012, she became a regular guest on the Loaded TV chat show, Looser Women Live, a programme regularly hosted by her friend, the model and fellow reality TV star, Nicola McLean. She plays the character of Jasmine in a low-budget British horror movie, Serial Killer, which was filmed in April and May 2013.

On 11 February 2015, Horgan-Wallace appeared as a 'claimant' on the ITV daytime show Judge Rinder, in a case against her fellow former BB7 contestant Michael Cheshire, alleging an unpaid debt; she won her case. She appeared on the Channel 5 show Celebrity Botched Up Bodies on 6 October 2016, regarding her dental veneers. On 25 March 2017, she appeared as a contributor in the Channel 5 show When Celebrity Goes Horribly Wrong and a week later she was featured in the Channel 4 programme How'd You Get So Rich? presented by famous Canadian comedian Katherine Ryan, in which she discussed her acquisition of a property portfolio.

Starting in 2017, Horgan-Wallace became a regular guest on ITV morning show Good Morning Britain, discussing issues of the day with other invited guests. On 12 November 2018 she appeared on Channel 4 show First Dates, where she was set up on a blind dinner date in the First Dates restaurant with Darren, a fellow Londoner. At the end of the show it was revealed the couple had yet to go on a second date. A week later she appeared in a feature within the Victoria Derbyshire show on BBC2 called "Brexit Blind Dates", in which opposing voices in the Brexit debate met for dinner. Horgan-Wallace, a supporter of 'Leave', debated the issue with Labour peer Professor The Lord Winston for 'Remain'. From 2019, Horgan-Wallace was a regular guest on BBC Radio 5 Live's 10 o'clock show, hosted by Sarah Brett and Rick Edwards, amongst others.

Bit on the Side incident 
On 22 September 2015, Horgan-Wallace appeared as a panelist on the Celebrity Big Brother's Bit on the Side after-show and got into a heated argument with fellow panelist Farrah Abraham. The show was taken off air ten minutes early after a "clash" between panellists. Abraham and Janice Dickinson were given police cautions. Horgan-Wallace was to face trial on charges of common assault and criminal damage, but according to the Daily Mirror, on 29 January 2016 the Crown Prosecution Service dropped all charges.

Go-kart incident
In April 2022, Horgan-Wallace crashed and was flung from a go-kart, landing on her head and was  almost paralysed.

Filmography

Films

Television

Other work
After Big Brother, Horgan-Wallace made numerous personal appearances in nightclubs around the UK. She hosted a show for the online radio station Invincible, was a guest commentator on BBC's Asian Network and made several guest appearances on Choice FM's Morning Vybe show.

Horgan-Wallace worked as an 'agony aunt' for More magazine and wrote a weekly column covering Big Brother 2007 for Reveal magazine, as well as writing a daily blog on its website. She reprised this role during the airing of the programme's ninth and tenth series.

In September 2007, it was announced that she had taken control of her own career via her management company, Aisleyne Ltd, along with co-director Richard Skeels.

On 10 February 2008 Aisleyne released a fashion range named "Unique by Aisleyne". She worked with the "high-end" fashion distributors Unique Collections Ltd, to design and produce the outfits. A complementary swimwear range was launched a few weeks later.

It was announced on 24 April 2008 that Mainstream Publishing had bought the right to publish her autobiography, entitled Aisleyne: Surviving Guns, Gangs and Glamour. This book was published on 7 May 2009. The launch party held on 6 May was attended by various celebrities, including Jodie Marsh, Charlie Brooker and Nate James.

On 24 and 27 March 2009, Horgan-Wallace co-hosted a radio show on SMUC Radio with Eamonn McCrystal.

On 10 June 2011, Horgan-Wallace was a judge in the Miss Universe Ireland beauty contest in Dublin.

In March 2014, Horgan-Wallace launched her own celebrity boot camp named Aisleyne's Booty Camp, based in a Country House near Grantham, Leicestershire.

In October 2016, Horgan-Wallace launched her own fitness app titled Aisleyne 7 Minute Workout, which was released on the Apple and Android Play Store platforms.

Philanthropy
Horgan-Wallace is a patron of Brain Tumour UK and acted as an ambassador for Club4Climate, an initiative based around parties in London's West End and elsewhere that aimed to prevent climate change. In 2007, she completed a London 10 kilometre run to raise money for Brain Tumour UK; she completed the same event on 6 July 2008.

Horgan-Wallace has been involved with the National Health Service 'Stop Smoking' campaign in association with Cancer Research UK,  and has given her support to No Smoking Day each year since 2008. She also became involved in the "Put the Knives and Guns Down!" campaign, aimed at encouraging teenagers to get off the streets and stop shootings and stabbings.

References

External links

Big Brother (British TV series) contestants
Glamour models
Living people
Fashion designers from London
British women fashion designers
Actresses from London
English television actresses
English film actresses
English columnists
English television presenters
British women television presenters
1978 births
British women columnists